William Burley (died 10 August 1458) was MP for Shropshire nineteen times and Speaker of the House of Commons of England.

Life
He was the eldest son of John Burley of Broncroft in Corvedale, who was himself six times MP for Shropshire.
Sir Simon de Burley was his great-great-uncle.

He served on several commissions and as a JP and escheator for Shropshire. He was appointed High Sheriff of Shropshire for 1426. He served as knight of the shire (MP) for Shropshire 19 times between 1417 and 1455.
The last parliament in which he was returned was that which was summoned to meet at Westminster, on 9 July 1455. 

He was chosen Speaker of the House, on 19 March 1436, in the place of Sir John Tyrrell, who was compelled by illness to retire from the chair. 
In the following parliament William Tresham was elected speaker; however, on 26 February 1444 Burley was again voted to the chair, and continued to preside over the house until the dissolution of that parliament.

Family
He married twice; firstly Ellen, daughter and coheiress of John Grendon, and widow of John Brown of Lichfield; they had 2 daughters and secondly Margaret, presumed daughter of Thomas Parys of Ludlow he had one daughter with his second wife called Sibilla.
He died intestate, leaving as his heirs his daughter Joan, married to the jurist, Sir Thomas Littleton of Teddesley, and his grandson, William Trussell, son of his other daughter, Elizabeth.

Notes

Attribution

References
History of Parliament - BURLEY, William (d.1458) of Broncroft in Corvedale, Salop.

1458 deaths
Speakers of the House of Commons of England
High Sheriffs of Shropshire
Year of birth missing
English MPs 1417
English MPs 1419
English MPs 1420
English MPs May 1421
English MPs 1422
English MPs 1425
English MPs 1427
English MPs 1429
English MPs 1431
English MPs 1432
English MPs 1433
English MPs 1437
English MPs 1439
English MPs 1442
English MPs 1445
English MPs November 1449
English MPs 1450
English MPs 1455